Feel the Pressure is the second studio album by Darren Styles. It was released on 23 August 2010.

Background

Styles' previous album Skydivin' (2008) was his début album as a solo artist and sold well achieving a Gold certification. Recording for Feel the Pressure followed on from the release of the first album and Styles' main collaborator was Re-Con who co-wrote and produced six songs on the album. Other producers included Manian, Chris Unknown and frequent collaborator Mark Breeze.

The album was released on All Around the World records on 23 August 2010 and reached a peak of No 23 on the UK Albums Chart.

Track listing

Personnel
 Darren Styles – vocals, producer (all tracks except disc 2 track 10), remixing (disc 1 track 12, disc 2 track 10)

Production
 Re-Con – producer (disc 1 tracks 1, 3, 7 & 8, disc 2 tracks 4 & 7)
 Manian – producer (disc 1 track 4)
 United in Dance – producer (disc 1 track 12)
 Francis Hill – producer (disc 1 track 13)
 Chris Unknown – producer (disc 2 tracks 5 & 6)
 Styles & Breeze – producer (disc 2 track 8)
 Vince Nysse & NJ Hinton – producer (disc 2 track 10)

Additional musicians
 Kelly Barnes – vocals (disc 1 tracks 3 & 8, disc 2 track 2)
 Lisa Abbott – vocals (disc 1 track 6)
 Mia J – vocals (disc 1 track 11)
 Molly – vocals (disc 2 track 5)
 Kirsty Anderson – vocals (disc 2 track 7)
Jenna Lee – vocals (disc 2 track  8)
 Pascale – vocals (disc 2 track 10)
 Mike Di Scala – backing vocals (disc 1 tracks 1 & 7)
 Francis Hill – guitar (disc 1 track 13, disc 2 track 11)

Other personnel
 Engine – artwork
 Ian McManus – photography

Chart performance

Release history

References

External links
 
 Feel the Pressure at Discogs

2010 albums
All Around the World Productions albums
Darren Styles albums
Universal Music TV albums